Romain Hardy (born 24 August 1988) is a professional cyclist, who currently rides for UCI ProTeam .

Career
Hardy left  at the end of the 2012 season, and joined  for the 2013 season. In June 2017, he was named in the startlist for the Tour de France.

Major results

 2008
 2nd Overall Tour de Gironde
 3rd Road race, National Under-23 Road Championships
 6th Overall Kreiz Breizh Elites
 2009
 4th Liège–Bastogne–Liège Espoirs
 6th Overall Grand Prix du Portugal
 9th Overall Coupe des nations Ville Saguenay
 2010
 1st Stage 4 Tour de l'Avenir
 3rd Polynormande
 3rd Boucles de l'Aulne
 4th Tour du Finistère
 4th Prueba Villafranca de Ordizia
 9th Overall Tour de Bretagne
 10th Overall Rhône-Alpes Isère Tour
 10th Overall Circuito Montañés
2011
 2nd Paris–Camembert
 2nd Tour du Doubs
 5th Les Boucles du Sud Ardèche
 7th Overall Tour du Gévaudan Languedoc-Roussillon
 8th Tour du Finistère
 9th Overall Tour Alsace
 10th Cholet-Pays de Loire
2012
 3rd Overall Rhône-Alpes Isère Tour
 4th Overall Tour du Haut Var
1st  Young rider classification
1st Stage 1
 4th Grand Prix de la Ville de Lillers
 6th Overall Tour Méditerranéen
 6th Grand Prix La Marseillaise
2014
 3rd Overall Tour of Turkey
 4th Paris–Camembert
 5th Overall Tour du Gévaudan Languedoc-Roussillon
 6th Boucles de l'Aulne
 6th Polynormande
 7th Overall Tour de Luxembourg
 10th Paris–Troyes
2016
 9th Boucles de l'Aulne
2017
 1st Tour du Doubs
 2nd Trofeo Laigueglia
 3rd Overall Tour du Haut Var
 6th Tour du Finistère
 7th La Drôme Classic
 9th Tour de Vendée
 10th Overall Étoile de Bessèges
2018
 7th Boucles de l'Aulne
 8th Grand Prix de Plumelec-Morbihan
2019
 1st Stage 1 Tour de Savoie Mont-Blanc
 2nd Overall Vuelta a la Comunidad de Madrid
 4th Paris–Camembert
 4th Tro-Bro Léon
 8th Tour du Finistère
 10th Paris–Troyes
2020
 4th Tour du Doubs
 9th Overall Tour de Wallonie
2021 
 5th Polynormande
 6th Trofeo Serra de Tramuntana
 7th Tour du Finistère
2022
 7th Overall Tour de Bretagne
 7th Overall Boucles de la Mayenne

Grand Tour general classification results timeline

References

External links

1988 births
Living people
French male cyclists
Sportspeople from Orne
Cyclists from Normandy